Elbow is a meteorite crater just north of the village of Riverhurst in Saskatchewan, Canada.

The crater is buried beneath younger sediments and is not exposed at the surface.

References

External links
Aerial exploration of the Elbow crater

Impact craters of Saskatchewan
Devonian impact craters
Maple Bush No. 224, Saskatchewan
Division No. 7, Saskatchewan